Edingthorpe Edingthorpe is a small village and former civil parish, now in the parish of Bacton, in the North Norfolk district, in the county of Norfolk, England. In 1931 the parish had a population of 213. On 1 April 1935 the parish was abolished and merged with Bacton under the County of Norfolk Review Order, 1935.

History
Edingthorpe's name is of mixed Anglo-Saxon and Viking origin and derives from an amalgamation of the Old English and Old Norse for Eadgyth's or Eadgifu's farmstead or settlement. The etymology of Edingthorpe is unusual because both Eadgyth and Eadgifu are feminine names.

Edingthorpe is not listed in the Domesday Book.

Geography
Edingthorpe falls within the constituency of North Norfolk and is represented at Parliament by Duncan Baker MP of the Conservative Party. For the purposes of Local Government, Edingthorpe is in the district of North Norfolk.

All Saints' Church
Edingthorpe's church is one of Norfolk's remaining 124 Anglo-Saxon round tower churches. All Saints' is largely a remnant of the Fourteenth Century with evident Twelfth Century foundations, the church also features examples of a Fourteenth Century painting of Saint Christopher.

"It has a very special dignity and simplicity, standing there on its low hill above the harvest fields as though it were the faithful servant of the life around it."- Siegfried Sassoon on All Saints' Church, Edingthorpe

War Memorial
Edingthorpe's war memorial takes the form of an inscription on a wooden altar rail inside All Saints' Church, with the fallen for the First World War also inscribed on the roof beams of the Churchyard's lynch gate. The memorial lists the following names for the First World War:
 L-Cpl. Bernard J. Muriel (d.1915), 1st Battalion, Essex Regiment
 John Childs
 Reginald Harvey
 Walter Pye
 Robert Scott
 George Spinks
 Frederick Watts

References 

Villages in Norfolk
Former civil parishes in Norfolk
North Norfolk